Utricularia holtzei is an annual affixed aquatic carnivorous plant that belongs to the genus Utricularia (family Lentibulariaceae). It is endemic to the Northern Territory.

See also 
 List of Utricularia species

References 

Carnivorous plants of Australia
Flora of the Northern Territory
holtzei
Lamiales of Australia
Taxa named by Ferdinand von Mueller